In molecular biology, the isocitrate/isopropylmalate dehydrogenase family is a protein family consisting of the evolutionary related enzymes isocitrate dehydrogenase, 3-isopropylmalate dehydrogenase and tartrate dehydrogenase.

Isocitrate dehydrogenase (IDH), is an important enzyme of carbohydrate metabolism which catalyses the oxidative decarboxylation of isocitrate into alpha-ketoglutarate. IDH is either dependent on NAD+  or on NADP+ . In eukaryotes there are at least three isozymes of IDH: two are located in the mitochondrial matrix (one NAD+-dependent, the other NADP+-dependent), while the third one (also NADP+-dependent) is cytoplasmic. In Escherichia coli the activity of a NADP+-dependent form of the enzyme is controlled by the phosphorylation of a serine residue; the phosphorylated form of IDH is completely inactivated.

3-isopropylmalate dehydrogenase  (IMDH) catalyses the third step in the biosynthesis of leucine in bacteria and fungi, the oxidative decarboxylation of 3-isopropylmalate into 2-oxo-4-methylvalerate.

Tartrate dehydrogenase  catalyses the reduction of tartrate to oxaloglycolate.

References

Protein domains